State highway spurs in Texas are owned and maintained by the Texas Department of Transportation (TxDOT).

Spur 200

Spur 200 is located in Roma. It runs from US 83 southwest to Estrella Street and the Roma Texas Port of Entry at the Roma–Ciudad Miguel Alemán International Bridge. The route is unsigned.

Spur 200 was designated on November 18, 1947, from US 83 along Bravo Alley to the international bridge. On September 28, 1988, the  section from Estrella Street to the bridge was removed and returned to Starr County.

Spur 201

Spur 201 was designated on December 17, 1947, from an intersection with then-approved SH 146 near Black Duck Bay to West Goose Creek Street in Baytown. On September 23, 1959, the road was extended northeast to SH 146 and the route was changed to Loop 201 (now SH 146).

Spur 202

Spur 202 is located in Gregory. It runs from SH 35 to US 181.

Spur 202 was designated on November 18, 1947, on the current route.

Spur 203

Spur 203 is located in Presidio. It runs from Business US 67-A to Cibolo Creek.

Spur 203 was designated on June 18, 1996, on he current route along an old routing of US 67. The northern terminus of Spur 203 once connected to a bridge when the route was part of US 67; the bridge was removed in 1996 due to rerouting of US 67.

Spur 206

Spur 206 is located in Harlingen. It runs from US 77 to Loop 499/FM 106.

Spur 206 was designated on July 22, 1948, from then-new US 77 to then-US 83 along an old routing of US 77. On March 14, 1961, the road was extended west 0.9 mile along Harrison Avenue (former US 83) to US 83. On March 29, 1987, a 0.768 mile section from Loop 448 (now Business US 77) to FM 106 was added. On August 4, 1988, by district request, the road was extended east 1.5 miles to Loop 499.

Spur 209

Spur 209 was designated on January 27, 1948, from then-approved SH 204 southwest along Henderson Street to South Street in Reklaw. Spur 209 was cancelled on February 23, 2006, and returned to the city of Reklaw.

Spur 213

Spur 213 is located in Wichita Falls. It runs from SH 240 to SH 79.
 
Spur 213 was designated on September 14, 1973, on the current route along an old routing of SH 79.

Spur 214

Spur 214 was designated on October 18, 1948, from SH 73 near a Southern Pacific Railroad line north of Texas Company Reservoir southeast to SH 87 near a Gulf Company refinery. On January 7, 1987, Spur 214 was cancelled by district request and transferred to SH 82.

Spur 215

Spur 215 is located in Jefferson County. It runs from SH 73 at Port Arthur Reservoir to SH 87 at Savannah and 16th Streets in Port Arthur.

Spur 215 was designated on October 18, 1948, on the current route.

Spur 216

Spur 216 is located in Eagle Pass.

Spur 216 was designated on July 25, 2012, on the current route as a renumbering of Spur 16.

Spur 216 (1948)

The original Spur 216 was designated on November 23, 1948, in Glen Rose from then-new US 67 to then-old US 67. Spur 216 was cancelled ten months later and became a portion of SH 144 when it was rerouted; the former route of SH 144 became CR 312.

Spur 217

Spur 217 was designated on January 21, 1969, from FM 1788 northeast to Midland-Odessa Regional Air Terminal. On May 29, 1991, Spur 217 was cancelled and transferred to Loop 40.

Spur 224

Spur 224 was designated on February 25, 1949, in Penelope from FM 308 southeast 0.17 mile along Commerce Street to an I&GN Railroad line. On January 26, 1958, Spur 224 was cancelled and transferred to FM 1888 (now FM 2114).

Spur 226

Spur 226 is located in Kaufman County. It runs from US 80 south to SH 34 in Terrell.

Spur 226 was designated on July 27, 2017, on its current route, replacing a portion of Business SH 34-A (the remainder was given to the city).

Spur 226 (1947)

The original Spur 226 was designated on January 22, 1947, from E. Front Street and Beckham Avenue in Tyler to an intersection with SH 64 and E. 5th Street. On August 28, 1958, the road was extended south to SH 110. At the same time, the route was signed, but not designated, as SH 155. Spur 226 was cancelled on August 29, 1990, as the SH 155 designation became official.

Spur 228

Spur 228 is located in Potter County. It runs from US 287 to the south entrance of the former Amarillo Air Force Base (now Rick Husband Amarillo International Airport).

Spur 228 was designated on May 22, 1959, on the current route.

Spur 228 (1949)

The original Spur 228 was designated on May 8, 1949, from FM 188 (later corrected to FM 888) at Argenta northeast 0.2 mile to the Bee County line. Spur 228 was cancelled on October 16, 1956, and redesignated as FM 888 Spur (now FM 3190).

Spur 231

Spur 231 is located in Robertson County. It runs from SH 6 in Benchley to Old Hearne Road.

Spur 231 was designated on April 30, 1975, on the current route. It was formerly part of SH OSR.

Spur 231 (1962)

The original Spur 231 was designated on December 1, 1961, in Wichita Falls from then-new US 287 at 18th Street east to then-US 287. Spur 231 was cancelled when new US 287 was completed.

Spur 232

Spur 232 (1950)

The first use of the Spur 232 designation was in Upshur County, from FM 993 at La Fayette to a point 1 mile southeast. Spur 232 was cancelled on January 27, 1953, and became an extension of FM 993.

Spur 232 (1969)

The next use of the Spur 232 designation was in Lubbock County, from US 62 (now US 62/SH 114) north 1 mile along an extension of Indiana Avenue across Texas Tech University to FM 2255. Spur 232 was cancelled on April 28, 1994, by district request and removed from the highway system; the university had the road built and had maintained it themselves and was removed because TxDOT no longer needed it.

Spur 233

Spur 233 is located in Oldham County. It runs from US 385 (former SH 51) to Boys Ranch.

Spur 233 was designated on January 27, 1950, on the current route.

Spur 234

Spur 234 is located in Grimes County. It runs from SH 105 south to Stoneham.

Spur 234 was designated on May 30, 1950, on the current route.

Spur 239

Spur 239 is located in Del Rio. It runs from US 90/US 277 and Spur 297 to the International Bridge.

Spur 239 was designated on September 28, 1950, from US 277 in Del Rio to the International Bridge as a replacement of a spur of US 277. On January 24, 1978, the road was rerouted along Las Vacas Road to Rio Grande Lane. On January 28, 1985, the road was extended northeast to new US 277, replacing a section of US 277. On September 25, 1997, by district request, the section from US 277 (concurrent with US 277 Spur) along Las Vacas and Garfield Lane to Rio Grande Lane was removed from the highway system and Spur 239 was rerouted along Gibbs Avenue and a new route to US 277 Spur.

Spur 240

Spur 240 is located in Eagle Pass. It runs from US 57 to Business US 277.

Spur 240 was designated on September 28, 1950, from US 277 in Eagle Pass to the International Bridge as a replacement of a spur of US 277. On December 21, 1983, Spur 240 was rerouted to run from US 57 to Loop 431 (now Business US 277) due to rerouting of US 277 and Loop 431.

Spur 241

Spur 241 is located in Hidalgo. It runs from US 281 at Fay's Corner to a point north of Bridge Street in Hidalgo.

Spur 241 was designated on February 5, 1951, from US 281 east of Hidalgo via Hildago to the International Bridge. On September 11, 1978, a section from the International Bridge to a point north of Bridge Street was cancelled. On August 14, 1979, the road was rerouted in Hidalgo and the section along Bridge Street and Rhode Avenue was cancelled.

Spur 242

Spur 242 is located in Pleasanton. It runs from FM 476 to SH 97.

Spur 242 was designated on March 22, 1951, on the current route. On July 16, 1965, the road was extended west 0.7 mile over FM 476 to new FM 476, although this did not change the route description.

Spur 243

Spur 243 was designated on January 23, 1939, from US 81 in Austin southwest along Lamar Boulevard to SH 29 at 45th Street. On August 24, 1954, Spur 243 was cancelled and returned to the city of Austin due to rerouting of US 183.

Spur 244

Spur 244 is located in Dallas. It runs from Loop 12 north of White Rock Lake to SH 78.

Spur 244 was designated on June 21, 1951, on the current route along an old routing of SH 78.

Spur 245

Spur 245 is located in Borger. It runs from Loop 140 to Spur 119.

Spur 245 was designated on October 30, 1951, on the current route.

Spur 246

Spur 246 is located in Borger. It runs from Spur 119 to SH 207.

Spur 246 was designated on October 30, 1951, from Spur 119 northeast of Borger northeast to SH 152. On July 13, 1959, the road was extended southwest 2.1 miles to SH 15 (now SH 207) south of Borger, replacing a section of FM 1551.

Spur 247

Spur 247 is located in Pyote. It runs from SH 115 to Spur 57.

Spur 247 was designated on July 25, 1960, from then-proposed SH 115 south to I-20 (later US 80, now Spur 57) along an old routing of SH 115.

Spur 247 (1951)

The original Spur 247 was designated on November 19, 1951, from US 81 east and south along Herff, S. Alamo, Probandt and Hick Streets to US 181 at S. Presa Street. The route became co-designated with US 87, and this was removed on March 18, 1960, cancelling Spur 247.

Spur 248

Spur 248 is located in Tyler. It runs from Loop 323 to SH 64.

Spur 248 was designated on February 20, 1959, on the current route.

Spur 248 (1952)

The original Spur 248 was designated on February 21, 1952, from SH 353 (now SH 174) to Blum. On October 27, 1953, Spur 248 was cancelled and transferred to FM 67.

Spur 250

Spur 250 was designated on August 27, 1969, from US 75 (now SH 75) 1 mile northwest of Mossy Grove northeast to I-45. On October 8, 1965, Spur 250 was cancelled and transferred to FM 2989.

Spur 253

Spur 253 was designated on April 29, 1952, from then-new US 81 west 0.55 mile along Central Avenue to Main Street in Belton. On December 13, 2007, Spur 253 was cancelled and returned to the city of Belton.

Spur 258

Spur 258 was designated on September 25, 1952, from US 181 in northwestern Kenedy southeast to SH 72 in Kenedy along an old routing of US 181. The route was signed as US 181 Business rather than Spur 258. On June 21, 1990, Spur 258 was cancelled and transferred to Business US 181-F.

Spur 259

Spur 259 is located in Webb County. It runs from SH 359 to Loop 20.

Spur 259 was designated on August 29, 2013, on the current route as a replacement of a section of Loop 20.

Spur 259 (1952)

The original Spur 259 was designated on September 25, 1952, from SH 72 (later Spur 542, now Business SH 72) in Kenedy south to US 181 south of Kenedy along an old routing of US 181. The route was signed as US 181 Business rather than Spur 259. On April 20, 1982, the road was extended north along 2nd and Escondido Streets due to rerouting of SH 72. Spur 259 was cancelled on June 21, 1990, and transferred to Business US 181-G.

Spur 260

Spur 260 is located in Laredo. It runs from US 83 to SH 359.

Spur 260 was designated on May 29, 2008, on the current route as a replacement of a section of Loop 20.

Spur 261

Spur 261 is located in Harris County. It runs along North Shepherd Drive from I-45 north of Houston to I-610.

Spur 261 was designated on March 24, 1954, along the current route.

Spur 263

Spur 263 is located in Navarro County. It runs from SH 31 near Dawson to Battle Creek Monument.

Spur 263 was designated on September 24, 1952, on the current route.

Spur 264

Spur 264 is located in Quinlan. It runs from SH 276 to SH 34.

Spur 274 was designated on January 28, 1970, as a redesignation of Loop 264 when a section was transferred to SH 276.

Spur 268

Spur 268 was designated on November 19, 1952, from US 80 (now Business I-20) near western Midland northeast to SH 158 (now Business SH 158) in Midland along an old routing of US 80. The route was signed as US 80 Business rather than Spur 268. On June 30, 2011, the route was changed to Loop 268.

Spur 269

Spur 269 was designated on November 19, 1952, from SH 158 (now Business SH 158) in Midland east to US 80 (now Business I-20) in Midland along an old routing of US 80. The route was signed as US 80 Business rather than Spur 269. On June 30, 2011, Spur 269 was cancelled and returned to the city of Midland.

Spur 270

Spur 270 was designated on June 24, 1953, from FM 299 (now SH 214) in Friona west along 5th Street to US 60. On January 30, 1976, the road was extended north 0.4 mile over former SH 214 along Main Street to US 60 and the western terminus was moved to new SH 214 when it was rerouted. Spur 270 was cancelled on June 21, 1990, and transferred to Business SH 214-A.

Spur 272

Spur 272 is located in Newton County. It runs from SH 12 (former SH 235) to Deweyville.

Spur 272 was designated on January 29, 1953, on the current route along an old routing of SH 87.

Spur 273

Spur 273 is located in Alvin. It connects SH 6 and Business SH 35.

Spur 273 was designated on August 28, 1953, along the current route.

Spur 274

Spur 274 (1954)

The first use of the Spur 274 designation was in Floyd County, from SH 207 to US 70 in Floydada. Spur 274 was cancelled eight months later when construction was completed.

Spur 274 (1968)

The next use of the Spur 274 designation was in Dallas County, from I-35E in Dallas west to west of Sylvan Avenue. Spur 274 was cancelled by mistake on December 7, 1971, but was restored on February 15, 1974. On January 21, 1981, Spur 274 was cancelled for real and became a portion of I-30.

Spur 276

Spur 276 (1954)

The first use of the Spur 276 designation was in Dalhart, from US 54 at Denver and Seventh Streets east 0.488 mile along Seventh Street to US 87 at Pine Street and Margaret Avenue. The route was signed as US 87 Business rather than Spur 276. Spur 276 was cancelled on June 21, 1990, and transferred to Business US 87-B.

Spur 276 (2008)

The next use of the Spur 276 designation was in El Paso County, from SH 20 north of Borderland Road to Loop 375 north of I-10. Spur 276 was cancelled on July 26, 2012, and redesignated as Spur 16.

Spur 277

Spur 277 is located in Coupland. It runs from FM 1466 to SH 95.

Spur 277 was designated on April 24, 1954, on the current route along an old routing of SH 95.

Spur 278

Spur 278 is located in Lufkin. It runs from Business US 69-J (S Chestnut Street) to Loop 266 (S First Street, old US 59).

Spur 278 was designated on October 27, 1953, on the current route. Although the route was to be signed as US 69 Business, it is currently signed as Spur 278.

Spur 280

Spur 280 is a short freeway located in Downtown Fort Worth. The route connects the eastern part of Downtown with I-35W and runs as a continuation of the Martin Luther King Jr. Freeway (US 287). It was designated on April 27, 1955, on its current route.

Exit list

Spur 284

Spur 284 was designated from Santa Anna to 4 miles east of Valera. On October 24, 1955, Spur 284 was cancelled and transferred to US 67.

Spur 285

Spur 285 was designated on April 17, 1955, from US 287 in western Quanah north to Spur 133 along an old routing of US 287. On December 17, 1970, Spur 285 was cancelled and became a portion of FM 2568.

Spur 290

Spur 290 is located in Temple. It runs from I-35 to Loop 363/SH 36/US 190.

Spur 290 was designated on December 19, 1955, from then-new US 81 (now I-35) north of Temple south to US 190 (now SH 53) in Temple along an old routing of US 81. The route was signed as US 81 Business rather than Loop 290. On January 24, 1978, the road was extended south along old SH 36 from SH 53 to Loop 363 and new SH 36.

Spur 294

Spur 294 is located in Navarro County. It runs from US 287 to the Richland Chambers Reservoir.

Spur 294 was designated on November 29, 1990, on the current route.

Spur 297

Spur 297 is located in Del Rio. It runs from US 90/US 277 to Spur 239.

Spur 297 was designated on January 19, 1956, from US 90 just east of the US 90/US 277 intersection in Del Rio south to US 277. On January 28, 1985, by district request, the section of Spur 297 along Bedell Avenue was returned to the city of Del Rio.

Spur 298

Spur 298 is located in McLennan County. It runs from US 84 near western Waco east to Spur 396 (former SH 6).

Spur 298 was designated on February 23, 1956, on the current route; the route was formerly a portion of Loop 2 before 1955.

Spur 299

Spur 299 is located in McLennan County. It runs from US 77/US 81 near eastern Waco east to US 84.

Spur 299 was designated on February 23, 1956, on the current route; the route was formerly a portion of Loop 2 before 1955.

References 

+02
State highway spurs 0200
State highway spurs 0200